The Prince Who Turns into a Frog is a 2005 Taiwanese drama starring Ming Dao, Joe Chen, Sam Wang and Joyce Chao. It was produced by Sanlih E-Television and directed by Chen Ming Zhang (陳銘章) and Liu Jun Jie (劉俊傑).

The series was first broadcast in Taiwan on free-to-air Taiwan Television (TTV) (台視) from 5 June 2005 to 16 October 2005, every Sunday at 21:30 and cable TV Sanlih E-Television (三立電視) from 11 June 2005 to 22 October 2005, every Saturday at 21:00. Episode seven was broadcast on 17 July 2005, which achieved an average rating of 7.05 and peaked at 8.05 and was the highest peak for a single episode for an idol drama until 2008.

The series was well-received, became one of the most popular Taiwanese idol dramas throughout Asia and brought Ming Dao and Joe Chen to prominence.

Summary
Shan Jun Hao (Ming Dao), the CEO of a large hotel chain, is the stereotypical heir: spoiled, cold-hearted, and ruthless. He meets Ye Tian Yu (Joe Chen), a schemer and somewhat of a gold-digger, who accidentally runs him over. This car accident causes Jun Hao to lose his memory; he becomes kindhearted and loving. Just as love is in the air, Jun Hao's family comes looking for him, desperate for his return to his original home. Jun Hao has a fiancée Fan Yun Xi (Joyce Chao) who loves him very much, waiting for him to come home. More accidents follow: Jun Hao loses his memories of Tian Yu and returns to his original spoiled self. Although Jun Hao returns to thinking of Tian Yu as a lying schemer, a surprising new love gradually blossoms.

Story
Shan Jun Hao (Ming Dao), hated by many people for his personality, gets hit by a car in a planned accident on the day of his wedding with Fan Yun Xi (Joyce Chao), a woman who loves Jun Hao. Ye Tian Yu (Joe Chen), who thought that it was her fault for crashing into the unconscious Jun Hao, brings him home, because she doesn't want to get arrested. He wakes up but doesn't remember anything of his past, so Ye Zheng Zhe, Tian Yu's brother, told her that his name is Dang Ou, their illegal cousin and allowed him to stay in their Money Coming store. Tian Yu and Dang Ou slowly develop feelings for each other. During this time, Xu Zi Qian (Sam Wang), a close friend of Shan Jun Hao, and Fa Yun Xi also begin to develop feelings for each other after they had given up looking for Jun Hao. Love and romance fills these two couples up. However, good times never last. Xu Zi Qian finds Dang Ou, and together with Yun Xi, forces Tian Yu to return Dang Ou. Tian Yu is granted one last day. After their last date, Tian Yu brings Dang Ou back to his real home. But Dang Ou doesn't give up and searches for Tian Yu. When he finally finds her, he gets hit on the head by gangsters and forgets the memories as Dang Ou and the sweet moments with Tian Yu. Then he becomes Shan Jun Hao again. Xu Zi Qian is in pain as well, because he loves Fan Yun Xi, but she has a blind loyalty to Shan Jun Hao, and almost immediately dumps Xu Zi Qian. Everything was back to "normal."

But love will not disappear easily. Ye Tian Yu meets Shan Jun Hao again. But Jun Hao does not clearly recall anything about Tian Yu, only loving memories of Fan Yun Xi. Being crushed, Xu Zi Qian and Ye Tian Yu start dating in order to forget about Jun Hao and Yun Xi. However, Jun Hao starts to develop feelings for Tian Yu as Jun Hao and not Dang-Ou. Zhang Min Han, the deputy-GM of Senwell, digs up information about the Shan's history between them and Yun Xi. When this is revealed to Xu Zi Qian and her ill-ridden mother, the mother dies of a heart-attack. Xu Zi Qian develops a mental and emotional breakdown and needs Tian Yu. But when he needed her the most, she was embracing Jun Hao during his wedding reception with Yun Xi. The constant/random encounters cause Jun Hao to slowly remember his life with Tian Yu and the side of Dang Ou awakens again.

At this point, Jun Hao then tells Tian Yu everything he feels for her at their wedding reception, in front of everybody, including Xu Zi Qian and Fan Yun Xi. Knowing it was a forbidden love, Tian Yu runs away in tears. Since she did, Xu Zi Qian's emotions become more violent, to the point where his naturally kind and gentle-hearted personality becomes harsh and unkind. He becomes the rightful owner of Senwell. Zhang Min Han, in hopes for a higher position, did this on purpose to Zi Qian, but it had gotten too far. At this point, Zi Qian believed all the problems of his life were Senwell's fault and begins to sell it. Fan Yun Xi later that day decided to divorce Jun Hao for his happiness, but because of her obsessive dreams of having a family, she too has a mental/emotional breakdown.

Jun Hao/Dang Ou returns to Tian Yu and they begin to pick up where they left off. Coincidentally, Xi Qian receives a call to pick up Fan Yun Xi because she fell into a river. Both are currently mentally and emotionally unstable, but Zi Qian, seeing Yun Xi in her state, gets angrier at Senwell and blames them for this. Zhang Min Han, in desperation, needs help for the person he brought down, Shan Jun Hao. Together, they stopped Xu Zi Qian from doing a huge mistake. Yun Xi, probably because of the moment, remembers that it was not Jun Hao that was there for her first, but Zi Qian, and she falls for him again. Zi Qian, after this incident, snaps out of it, and realizes that he loves Yun Xi too. They escape from a signing that will transfer all Senwell holdings to Queen Ann Mary Hotel, but the hotel sends people to stop them, causing Tian Yu to get knocked unconscious. Awakening after a month, she pretends to also lose her memory. But Junhao manages to win her back again. In the end, Tian Yu and Jun Hao get married, and Zi Qian and Yun Xi become a couple of travelers.

Characters

Location

 Money Coming store – Southwest Coast National Scenic Area, Tainan City, Beimen District in Taiwan
 Senwell Hotel Group – Tainan City

Cast

Main Cast
 Joe Chen as Ye Tian Yu (葉天瑜)
 Ming Dao as Shan Jun Hao (單均昊) and Dangou (茼蒿)
 Sam Wang as Xu Zi Qian (徐子騫)
 Joyce Chao as Fan Yun Xi (范芸熙)
 Gino Tsai as Zhang Ming Han (張明寒)
 Su Li Xin as Su Li Xin (蘇立欣)
 Wang Juan (王琄) as Chen Jin Zhi (陳金枝)

Extended Cast
 Li Dai Ling as Jiang Cai Yue (江采月)
 Ehlo Huang Yu Rong as Li Da Wei (李大偉)
 Zhao Shun as Tang Shun Ming (唐順明)
 Cheng Bo Ren as Li Tong Luo (李銅鑼)
 Anthony Xie as Ye Zheng Zhe (葉正哲)
 Yun Zhong Yue as Shan Yao Rong (單耀榮)
 Lu Man Yin (呂曼茵) as Wu Yue Jiao (吴月嬌) / Wu Feng Jiao (吴鳳嬌)
 Qiu Long Jie as Tong Hua Shun (童花順)
 Na Wei Xun as Chuan Yu Nan
 Hu Pei Wei as Wang Pin Sheng
 Yang Hao as Gary
 Yen Hsing-su as Xie Quan (謝全)
 Jacky Chu as Huang Mai Ke (黃麥克)
 Sun Xing
 Hu Kang Xing (胡康星) as Ah Sheng (阿勝)
 Renzo Liu as Ding Yuan Xun (丁元勳)
 Sonia Sui as Dai An Fen (黛安芬)

Soundtrack

The Prince Who Turns into a Frog Original Soundtrack (王子變青蛙 電視原聲帶) was released on 13 January 2006 by 183 Club, 7 Flowers and VJ under Sony Music Entertainment (Taiwan). It contains eleven songs, in which four songs are various instrumental versions of the original songs. The opening theme song is "迷魂計" or "Enhancing Trick", while the ending theme song is entitled "真愛" or "Pure Love", both sung by 183 Club.

Track listing

International broadcast
  – GMA Network from 10 October 2005 to 19 January 2006
  – TVB Jade from 12 February 2006 to 25 June 2006 on Sundays
  – DATV from 2 March 2010 on Tuesdays at 21:00 to 23:00
  - 8TV (Malaysia), Astro (television)
  - Yoshlar TV known as Ishq jodusi

Remakes
It was unofficially a remake of Save the Last Dance for Me, a South Korean TV series aired in 2004. It was then remade in Indonesia as Aku Bukan Untukmu (I'm not for you) in 2005, as Waking Love Up in 2015 and Forget You Remember Love in 2020, respectively, in Mainland China.

References

External links
  The Prince Who Turns into a Frog official homepage at TTV
  The Prince Who Turns into a Frog official homepage at SETTV
  The Prince Who Turns into a Frog official homepage at TVB Jade

Taiwanese drama television series
Taiwan Television original programming
Sanlih E-Television original programming
2005 Taiwanese television series debuts
2005 Taiwanese television series endings
Television shows written by Ding-yu Xie